{{DISPLAYTITLE:C4H10}}
The molecular formula C4H10 (molar mass: 58.12 g/mol, exact mass: 58.0783 u) may refer to:

 Butane, or n-butane
 Isobutane, also known as methylpropane or 2-methylpropane